Auratonota pharata is a species of moth of the family Tortricidae described by John W. Brown in 2006. It is found in Costa Rica, Panama, Venezuela, Guyana and French Guiana.

The ground colour of the forewings is ferruginous, with light silvery-grey reticulations. The basal portion is suffused with blackish brown between the reticulations. The hindwings are uniform dark brown. Adults have been recorded on wing from January to March and from June to November.

Etymology
The specific name is derived from the word pharate (meaning cloaked or hidden).

References

External links

Moths described in 2006
pharata
Moths of Central America
Moths of South America